The 1926 The Citadel Bulldogs football team represented The Citadel, The Military College of South Carolina as a member of the Southern Intercollegiate Athletic Association (SIAA) the 1926 college football season. Carl Prause served as head coach for the fifth season. The Bulldogs played as members of the Southern Intercollegiate Athletic Association and played home games at College Park Stadium in Hampton Park.

Schedule

References

Citadel Bulldogs
The Citadel Bulldogs football seasons
Citadel football